Paraburkholderia sabiae is a Gram-negative, catalase- and oxidase-positive non-spore-forming bacterium of the genus Paraburkholderia and the family Burkholderiaceae, which was isolated from the nitrogen-fixing nodules on the roots of Mimosa caesalpiniaefolia in Brazil.

References

sabiae
Bacteria described in 2008